Wangay Dorji (born 9 January 1974) is a former football player from Bhutan. He played as striker for Samtse, Ranjung United, Druk Pol and Transport United.

Dorji gained international fame after scoring a hat-trick against Montserrat in The Other Final. Bhutan won the match 4–0.

Dorji was captain of the Bhutanese national team.

Career statistics

International goals

References

External links

1976 births
Association football forwards
Bhutan international footballers
Bhutanese footballers
Druk Pol F.C. players
Transport United F.C. players
Living people